The Third Military Region is a military region of Armed Forces of Yemen. Its headquarters locates in Marib city, the capital of Marib Governorate.

History 
The third region was established in 2013 as part of the military restructuring by former president Abdrabbuh Mansur Hadi who issued a republication decree to divide the military field into seven regions, including the Third Military Region. The region is headquartered in Marib city and supervises the military units in Marib and Shabwah Governorates.

Structure 
The region consists of over 10 military units and brigades, including; 14th Armored Brigade, 107th Infantry Brigade, 312 Armored Brigade, 21 Infantry Brigade, 26th Infantry Brigade. and 13th Infantry Brigade.

Leadership 

 Major General Ahmed Saif al-Yafiya (2013–  7April 2015)
 Major General Abdurabu al-Sahdadi (2015– 7 October 2016)
 Major General Adel Hashim al-Qumairi ( 7 October 2016– 21 January 2017)
 Major General Ahmed Hassan Jubran ( 21 January 2017– 27 May 2018)
 Major General Faisal Ali ( 27 May 2018– 11 November 2020)
 Major General Mansour Thawaba ( 11 November 2020– incumbent)

See also 

 First Military Region
 2nd Military Region (Yemen)

References 

Military regions of Yemen
Military of Yemen
Ministry of Defense (Yemen)
2013 establishments in Yemen